The Indoor League was a pub games competition series that was produced by Yorkshire Television and aired from 1973 until 1977. The programme was hosted by former England cricketer Fred Trueman (1931–2006).

Background

The first series of The Indoor League began transmission,  by ITV, on 5 April 1973 at 1 pm and ran for the following six weeks. The TV Times magazine dated 31 March 1973 contains a one-and-a-half-page editorial on it, featuring noted darts player Tom Barrett. Most of the competitions were filmed the year before transmission. From series 2 onwards, The Indoor League made its various competitions open to international competitors, and they played for the Indoor League World Championships.

Presenter Fred Trueman often wore a cardigan and smoked a pipe throughout his links. He always ended the show with the Yorkshire dialect phrase, "ah'll see thee". The programme's theme tune was Waiting For You by André Brasseur.

The show featured many indoor games, the majority of which were pub games, each of which had a prize of £100 for the competition winners. The sports included darts, pool, bar billiards, bar skittles, table football ( foosball), arm wrestling and shove ha'penny amongst others. Among the commentators were Dave Lanning and Keith Macklin. The programme was broadcast from The Leeds Irish Centre, which was later recognised as the 'birthplace of television darts'

The Indoor League was created by Sid Waddell, who also produced the series from 1972 to 1976. Darts coverage on television was in its infancy, with the News of the World Darts Championship having just begun to be broadcast on ITV in 1972. Waddell would later go on to become one of the voices of darts on television when the World Championship was created in 1978.

In the first series, all darts matches were played on a Northern England "doubles dartboard" that does not have any treble scoring segments. The competition was restricted to players from within the Yorkshire Television region but, due to the programme's success, from the second series onwards the men's and womens' darts competitions were open to all players from around the globe, and they played for the Indoor League World Darts Championships. In the final series there was also an international mixed darts tournament. The winner of the first competition received £100, with the runner-up getting £50. From the 1974 Season onwards, the winner of the men's darts tournament qualified for the BDO World Masters the following year.

The first two series were released on DVD by Network Publishing but are now out of print. All available episodes were repeated by now defunct UK digital channel FrontRunner TV.

Series air dates

According to the ITV listing magazine TV Times, programmes were shown by the different ITV regions on different days of the week and at different times across their schedules. Some ITV regions showed an episode of the programme one or more weeks later than other ITV regions. The details above are taken from TV Times.

Tournament winners

The Indoor League Men's Darts Championships
 1972  Colin Minton beat  Charles Ellis 2–0 (Played on a Yorkshire dartboard)
 1973  Tommy O'Regan beat  Alan Evans 2–0
 1974  Leighton Rees beat  Alan Evans
 1975  Conrad Daniels beat  Cliff Inglis (Championship of Champions)
 1976  Leighton Rees beat  Charlie Ellix 3–0 (Indoor League World Championship)
 1977  Tony Brown beat  David "Rocky" Jones (Indoor League World Championship)

The Indoor League Ladies' Darts Championships
 1973  Loveday King beat  Jessie Catterick 2–0
 1974  Greta Hallgren beat  Millie Bergeson 2–1
 1975  Jean Dickinson beat  Brenda Simpson 2–1 (Championship of Champions)
 1976  Jean Dickinson beat  Margaret Lally 2–0 (Indoor League World Championship)
 1977  Sandra Gibb vs  Margaret Lally (Indoor League World Championship)

The Indoor League Mixed Pairs' Darts World Championship
 1977  Ken Brown &  Sandra Gibb beat  Kevin White &  Lynn Stewart (Indoor League World Championship)

Indoor League Bar Billiards Championships
 1972  "Taffy" John 2,820–1,450  Malcolm Rider 
 1973  John Baker 2,400–1,440  Peter Wells 
 1974  John Peters 4,200–3,050  John Baker
 1975  Roy Buckle 900–?  Alan Sales
 1976  Stan Pratt beat  Gerry Lambert
 1977 Not held

After the second series, The Indoor League Bar Billiards added the unusual rule of a 45-second maximum break limit. This was to allow full games to be shown during the 18-minute TV as breaks in bar billiards can go on for long periods of time.

Indoor League Arm Wrestling Championships
 1972 Not held
 1973  Donald "Buster" Witney beat  "King" Ben Boothman 1–0 
(Ben Boothman went on to have a successful wrestling career as King Ben with ITV's World of Sport Wrestling)
 1974  Clive Myers beat  Tony Lees 2–1
 1975 Right-handed –  Tony Fitton beat  Tony Lees
(Tony Fitton left the UK shortly after this season to work in the USA. He was exposed in a Sports Illustrated exclusive in 2008 as being the so called "Godfather of Steroids", contributing to the major steroid problem in American Sports during the 80s and 90s) 
 1975 Left-handed –  Bill Richardson beat  Paul Jordan
(Bill only entered the left handed competition because all the spots in the right handed competition was taken. He later won Universe Championships Mr Universe in 1980)
 1976 Under 200 lb –  Clive Myers beat  Joe Graham 2–0
 1976 Left-handed –  Mike Winch beat  Alan Jackson
 1976 Super heavyweight –  Bill Richardson beat  Donald "Buster" Witney 2–0
 1977 Under 200 lb –  Clive Myers vs ?
 1977 Left-handed –  Mike Winch vs ?
 1977 Super Heavyweight –  Bill Richardson vs ?

Indoor League American Pool Championships
 1972 Not held
 1973  John Ashcroft 1–0  Ray Edmonds
 1974  Willie Thorne 3–0  Ray Edmonds
 1975  Ray Edmonds 2–1  Willie Thorne
 1976 Not held
 1977  Phil Tyas vs  Dean Emmott

Indoor League Table Skittles Championships
 1972  Philip Senior beat  Dennis Jones
 1973  John Chell beat  William Woolwich
 1974–1977 Not held

Indoor League Table Football Championships
 1972 John Kropacz & Frank Bowett 6–0 Eric Crane & Stephen Kelly
 1973 Speedy Campbell & Bervis Harris 6–3 John Kropacz & Frank Bowett
 1974 Nelly Nelson & John McKrith 6–5 John Kropacz & Frank Bowett
 1975–1977 Not held

Indoor League Shove Ha'Penny Championships
 1972 Alan Brown beat Barry Stones
 1973 Bryn Turner beat Alan Brown
 1974–1977 Not held

1972 Indoor League Men's Darts Results

All matches were played on a Northern England dartboard that does not have any treble scoring segments. The 1972 darts tournament was limited to players within the Yorkshire TV region. The winner received £100 and the runner up £50. There was no women's darts tournament in 1972. Only the final, two semi-finals and two of the quarter finals were transmitted during the 1972 series of six episodes.

1973 Indoor League Men's Darts Results

Alan Evans, in his semi-final match against Tony Ridler became the first ever male player to score a 180 on Television. In the same game, Ridler also scored a 180 in the second leg.

The current News of the World Darts Championship winner Ivor Hodgkinson entered the tournament but was beaten in the first round by Frank Crolla.

The tournament featured several internationally capped darts players. Winner O'Regan played for both England and Ireland before becoming captain of Ireland. Willie Etherington, Ron Church and Des Stabb represented England, Bob Whyte represented Scotland,Alan Evans and Tony Ridler played for Wales, George Foster represented Australia and Al Lippman represented United States of America.

1974 Indoor League Men's Darts Championship Results

Doug Priestner, hit a 180 with his first three darts in the competition.

1975 Indoor League Men's Darts Championship Results

For the second year running Doug Priestner, hit a 180 with his first three darts in the competition. Cliff Inglis, hit back-to-back 180s in one of his matches.

1976 Indoor League Men's Darts World Championship Results

In the 1976 Indoor League men's darts World Championship players were redrawn after each round. And the draw above reflects this.

1976 Indoor League Ladies Darts World Championship Results

1977 Indoor League Men's Darts World Championship Results

Reigning champion Leighton Rees was unbelievably at the time of filming the competition due to him touring Australasia doing dart exhibitions.
In the 1977 Indoor League men's darts World Championship players were redrawn after each round. And the draw above reflects this.

1977 Indoor League Mixed Pairs Darts World Championship Results

During the second semi-final, Peter Chapman become the first player to a televised 180 in a mixed pairs game, and Sandra Gibb scored the first ever televised 180 scored by a female player.

The semi-finals and final in this mixed pairs competition were the best of five legs of 701.

References

External links

Indoor League at UK Gameshows web site
Major Darts tournament winners

Darts tournaments
British sports television series
1973 British television series debuts
1978 British television series endings
1970s British game shows
1970s British sports television series
ITV game shows
Television series by ITV Studios
Television series by Yorkshire Television
English-language television shows